Hendrik Johannes Louw "Harry" Morkel (8 December 1888 – 16 July 1956) was a South African international rugby union player. He was born in Kimberley and first played provincial rugby for Western Province. He made his only Test appearance for South Africa during their 1921 tour of New Zealand. He played as a lock for the 1st Test of the series, a 13–5 loss at Carisbrook. Morkel died in 1956, in Strand, at the age of 67.

References

1888 births
1956 deaths
Rugby union locks
Rugby union players from Kimberley, Northern Cape
South Africa international rugby union players
South African rugby union players
Western Province (rugby union) players